William Charles Jordan (9 December 1885 – 1 December 1949) was an English footballer who played in the Football League for Everton, West Bromwich Albion and Wolverhampton Wanderers. He was also part of Great Britain's squad for the football tournament at the 1908 Summer Olympics, but he did not play in any matches. He appeared once for England Amateurs, in a match against France on 23 March 1908. The match, which is recognized as a full international by the French FA, was won by England 12–0, and Jordan scored six times.

References

1885 births
1949 deaths
English footballers
Association football forwards
English Football League players
Liverpool F.C. players
West Bromwich Albion F.C. players
Oxford University A.F.C. players
Everton F.C. players
Wolverhampton Wanderers F.C. players